The Southern Hotel in Llano, Texas was erected circa 1881 by stonemasons J. K. Finlay and John Goodman in the Second Empire style for owner J.W. Owen. The hotel was built as a stagecoach stop between Mason and Burnet, later serving as a hotel and a boarding house. Originally only a two-story building, a third floor was added when Colonel W.A.H. Miller bought the hotel in 1883. It was later renamed the Colonial Inn and ceased operations in the 1950s.

It was designated a Recorded Texas Historic Landmark in 1980, Marker number 9455, and added to the National Register of Historic Places in Texas October 10, 1979.

See also

National Register of Historic Places listings in Llano County, Texas
Recorded Texas Historic Landmarks in Llano County

References

Hotel buildings completed in 1881
Buildings and structures in Llano County, Texas
Commercial buildings on the National Register of Historic Places in Texas
Recorded Texas Historic Landmarks
National Register of Historic Places in Llano County, Texas
1881 establishments in Texas